Robert Willis Warren (August 30, 1925 – August 20, 1998) was a United States district judge for the Eastern District of Wisconsin.  He had previously served as attorney general of Wisconsin and represented Brown and Calumet Counties in the Wisconsin State Senate.

Education and career

Born in Raton, New Mexico, Warren received a Bachelor of Arts degree from Macalester College in 1950, a Master of Arts from the University of Minnesota in 1951, and a juris doctor from the University of Wisconsin Law School in 1956. He was in the United States Army, 95th Infantry, from 1943 to 1946. He served in Europe during World War II and was wounded in France, receiving a Purple Heart. He became a foreign affairs officer in the United States Department of State from 1951 to 1953. Warren practiced law in Elkhorn, Wisconsin, from 1956 to 1957, and then moved to Green Bay, where he practiced law from 1957 to 1959. He was an assistant district attorney of Brown County, Wisconsin, from 1959 to 1961, and became district attorney from 1961 to 1965. Warren was a member of the Wisconsin State Senate from 1965 to 1969. From 1969 until his resignation in 1974, he was attorney general of Wisconsin.

Federal judicial service

Warren was nominated by President Richard Nixon on August 8, 1974, to a seat on the United States District Court for the Eastern District of Wisconsin vacated by Judge Robert Emmet Tehan. He was confirmed by the United States Senate on August 22, 1974, and received his commission on August 27, 1974. He served as chief judge from 1986 to 1991. He was appointed a judge of the United States Foreign Intelligence Surveillance Court of Review by Chief Justice William Rehnquist in 1989, serving until 1996. He assumed senior status on August 1, 1991. His service terminated on August 20, 1998, due to his death in Milwaukee.

References

External links

1925 births
1998 deaths
20th-century American judges
Judges of the United States District Court for the Eastern District of Wisconsin
Macalester College alumni
Military personnel from New Mexico
Military personnel from Wisconsin
People from Raton, New Mexico
Politicians from Green Bay, Wisconsin
United States district court judges appointed by Gerald Ford
University of Wisconsin Law School alumni
University of Minnesota alumni
District attorneys in Wisconsin
Wisconsin Attorneys General
Wisconsin state senators
Judges of the United States Foreign Intelligence Surveillance Court of Review
20th-century American politicians